Astoria is a 2000 American drama film directed by Nick Efteriades, starring Rick Stear, Ed Setrakian, Joseph D'Onofrio, Paige Turco and Geraldine LiBrandi.

Cast
 Rick Stear as Alex
 Ed Setrakian as Demos
 Joseph D'Onofrio as Theo
 Paige Turco as Elena
 Geraldine LiBrandi as Soula
 Steven J. Christopher as Lakis
 Yanni Sfinias as Mitsos
 Gregory Sims as George
 Stelio Savante as Nick
 Chelsea Altman as Betty

Release
The film premiered at the Santa Barbara International Film Festival on 10 March 2000. The film was released in theatres on 5 April 2002.

Reception
Lawrence Van Gelder of The New York Times wrote that while Efteriades "may not have generated many sparks", with his "affection for Astoria and its people", he has "given his tale a warm glow". Gene Seymour of Newsday rated the film 3 stars out of 5 and wrote that while "the verbiage grows quite thick in patches" and "the story itself is fairly predictable", there are "intriguing variations of light and shadow that, while not exactly freshening the coming-of-age conventions, add deft touches of polish and grit."

Maitland McDonagh of TV Guide rated the film 2.5 stars out of 5 and wrote that while the film is "efficiently directed and acted", it is a "very familiar tale", and "it's hard to feel its pull". Todd McCarthy of Variety wrote that the film "lacks the originality and vitality required of an indie to make it in the real world."

References

External links
 
 

American drama films
2002 drama films